Steven Wilson (born August 10, 1979) is an American professional wrestler best known under the ring name Kongo Kong. He is best known for his time with Global Force Wrestling and Impact Wrestling.

Early career
Wilson went to Saginaw Valley State University in Michigan, where he played football. While there, Wilson saw an advertisement for a wrestling school where he trained under Joe Ortega.

Professional wrestling career

Independent circuit (1998–present)
Wilson made his professional wrestling debut in October 1998, where he competed under the ring name, Osyris, a character that Wilson modeled after Big Van Vader and Hulk Hogan. Wilson would go on to continue using this name through most of his independent run. 
In 2010, Wilson made his Juggalo Championship Wrestling debut now donning face-paint under the new name, Kongo Kong, a non-talking monster heel. The Kongo Kong gimmick was created by JCW co-founder, Violent J.

Global Force Wrestling (2015–2017)
Kong made his Global Force Wrestling (GFW) debut on June 13, 2015 as part of the GFW Grand Slam Tour, losing to Moose. On July 10, 2015, Kong faced Nick Aldis as part of the GFW Grand Slam Tour in Erie, Pennsylvania, making this their first of three matches during the tour which saw him losing on all three occasions. The following night, Kong defeated Aldis in a rematch. On July 24, 2015, Kong entered into a tournament to crown the inaugural GFW Global Champion, losing to Nick Aldis in the quarterfinals of the tournament. On October 23, 2015, Kongo defeated Brian Myers and Kevin Kross in a three way number one contenders match for the GFW Global Championship. On July 1, 2016, during a GFW Live event in Marion, Illinois, Kong defeated Danny Duggan and Joey Avalon and Mike Outlaw in a four-way match.

Impact Wrestling (2017–2019)
On the April 13, 2017 edition of Impact Wrestling, he debuted attacking Braxton Sutter as Sienna's surprise. The following week on April 20, Kong made his in-ring debut, defeating Chris Silvio. On April 27, he defeated Matt Sigmon. On the May 25, 2017, episode of Impact Wrestling Kong teamed with KM defeating Braxton Sutter and Mahabali Shera after both teams began a feud with each other. On June 15, 2017, episode of Impact Wrestling that occurred in Mumbai, India, Kong competed in a Gauntlet match for the inaugural Sony SIX Invitational Trophy, which was won by Mahabali Shera. On July 2, 2017, during the Pre Show of Slammiversary XV, Kong teamed with KM and Laurel Van Ness losing to Mahabali Shera, Braxton Sutter and Allie in a Six-person tag team match. On the August 24 episode of TNA Impact!, Kong Competed in a 20-man gauntlet match, for a shot to win the vacant Impact World Championship, which was won by Eli Drake. In 2018, Kong feuded with Brian Cage. On June 7, 2019, it was reported that Kong had parted ways with Impact Wrestling since the promotion didn't have plans for him.

Personal life
In March 2019, Wilson started and now runs his own Pro Wrestling School in Bluffton, Indiana called Prof. Kongo Kong's Pro Wrestling Academy with Mark Vanderkolk also known as Mark Vandy.

On June 20, 2020, independent wrestler Kyle Boone tweeted about being assaulted and bullied by Kong at an independent wrestling event. Boone stated that he was forced to show his penis in front of the entire locker room and give him the money he made from the show and selling merch. Kong responded by saying when started in the business, it was not uncommon to rib rookies. He continued his statement by saying if he had known sooner, he would have tried to hash it out like adults. He was not given any indication that something was wrong as it was all "hugs and smiles". He also stated he would pick on people he liked and saw something in.

Championships and accomplishments
American Pro Wrestling Alliance
APWA Global Championship (1 time)
APWA Quardruple Crown Championship (1 time)
Border City Wrestling
BCW Can-Am Heavyweight Championship (1 time)
Battle On The Border
BOTB Heavyweight Championship (1 time)
Border Town Pro Wreslting
Border Town Pro Championship (1 time, current)
Crossfire Wrestling
CW  Heavyweight Championship (1 time)
CW Tag Team Championship (1 time) - with Bin Hamin 
Elite Pro Wrestling
Elite Pro Heavyweight Championship (1 time)
Extreme Wrestling Federation
EWF Heavyweight Championship (2 times)
EWF Midwestern Championship (1 time)
EWF Tag Team Championship (1 time) – with Hurricane
Funkdefied Wrestling Federation
FWF Heavyweight Championship (1 time)
Heroes And Legends Wrestling
HLW Heavyweight Championship (1 time)
Independent Wrestling Association Mid-South
IWA Mid-South Heavyweight Championship (3 times)
Ted Petty Invitational (2015)
Insanity Pro Wrestling
IPW World Championship (1 time)
Juggalo Championship Wrestling
JCW Heavyweight Championship (1 time)
Mid-Ohio Wrestling
Mid-Ohio Heavyweight Championship (1 time)
Price of Glory Wrestling
POGW Tag Team Championship (1 time) – with Idol Heinze
Glory Cup (2011)
Pro Wrestling Illustrated
Ranked No. 134 of the top 500 singles wrestlers in the PWI 500 in 2018
Pro Wrestling Zero1
ZERO1 USA Northern States Championship (1 time)
Pure Pro Wrestling 
PPW Michigan Heavyweight championship (1 time)
Revolution Championship Wrestling
RCW Tag Team Championship (1 time)
Survival Of The Biggest (2021)
Strong Style Wrestling
SSW Heavyweight Championship (1 time)
Xtreme Intense Championship Wrestling
XICW Proving Grounds Championship (1 time)
XICW  United States Championship (1 time)
XICW Xtreme Intense Championship (1 time)

References

External links

Steve Wilson IMDb profile
Impact Wrestling Profile
Facebook profile
GFW profile

1979 births
Living people
20th-century professional wrestlers
21st-century professional wrestlers
American male professional wrestlers
Saginaw Valley State Cardinals football players
Sportspeople from Grand Rapids, Michigan
Sportspeople from Fort Wayne, Indiana
People from Bluffton, Indiana
Professional wrestlers from Indiana